Haytham E. Kenway is a fictional character in Ubisoft's Assassin's Creed video game franchise. He is introduced as the false protagonist of Assassin's Creed III (2012), in which players control him for the game's initial chapters, before being revealed as the true antagonist. Haytham also serves as a supporting character in Assassin's Creed Rogue (2014), which takes place between his playable chapters in Assassin's Creed III and the latter part of the game, and his backstory is further explored in the novel Assassin's Creed: Forsaken. In the games, he is portrayed by actor Adrian Hough through performance capture.

Within the series' alternate historical setting, Haytham was born in 1725 as the son of Edward Kenway, one of the leading members of the British Brotherhood of Assassins and the protagonist of the prequel game Assassin's Creed IV: Black Flag (2013). Following his father's murder in 1735, he is manipulated into joining the Templar Order, the Assassins' arch-enemies, and eventually becomes one of the Order's leading members as the Grand Master of the North American colonial rite. Under Haytham's leadership, the Templars exterminate most of the Colonial Assassins, becoming the dominant force on the continent, and attempt to build a new nation under their rule by manipulating events behind the scenes, such as starting the American Revolutionary War. During this time, Haytham sires a son, Ratonhnaké:ton / Connor, with a Native American woman, who in turn joins the Assassins and undoes most of his father's work. Though Haytham and Connor briefly become allies and consider unifying their orders, they both ultimately realise that peace between the Assassins and Templars is impossible, and their conflict culminates with Haytham's death at Connor's hands in 1781.

Prior to Assassin's Creed IIIs release, Haytham was not advertised as a playable character in order to surprise players. The twist that players were actually controlling a Templar during the first third of the game was praised for its cleverness and for being the first time in the series that players got to experience the Templars' point of view in the storyline, although some criticized the inclusion of Haytham's sequences for hurting the game's pacing. Unlike his son Connor, who had a divisive reception, Haytham was well-received for his charm and complexity, and is considered one of the best villains in the franchise.

Creation and conception
Haytham's inclusion as a playable character was kept secret from the press and was only known to the development team, with all advertisement solely focusing on Connor. Looking back on the game in 2019, Alex Hutchinson, the Creative Director of Assassin's Creed III, named the decision to make Haytham the surprise protagonist of the first third of the game as an effective idea to draw players into the narrative. It also offers a fresh perspective on the conflict between Assassins and Templars, as Haytham is the first playable Templar in the series. However, he noted that his character arc was far too long because there was no time for extensive product testing, which led to some backlash from players. According to series writer Susan Patrick, in Rogue, the emphasis of his role was placed on him being a role model for Assassin-turned-Templar Shay Patrick Cormac, because they both had similar backgrounds, while one of the main objectives of the game was to show the missing chapters in Haytham's life. Adrian Hough, the actor who performed Haytham's voice and motion capture, noted that the writing was very good for the character, and acknowledged that the development team gave him artistic freedom to make the character his own, ultimately considering him a product of his performance as well as writing and animation.

Darby McDevitt, the narrative director of the 2020 series installment Assassin's Creed Valhalla, found an opportunity to include a reference to Haytham in the game. Recalling that some fans had given feedback that Haytham sounded like an Arabic name, McDevitt suggested "Haytham or Hytham" for the name of a supporting character who brings the Hidden Ones back to England during the events of Valhalla, which serves as an in-universe basis for Edward Kenway's likely decision to name his son.

Fictional character biography
Born in 1725 in London to former pirate-turned-Master Assassin Edward Kenway and his second wife Tessa, Haytham belonged to the British nobility and was raised secluded from other children, being trained to be an Assassin from an early age. However, this changed in 1735, when Edward was murdered by unknown assailants who broke into their home one night. Haytham's half-sister, Jennifer, was kidnapped in the confusion, while Haytham was forced to kill for the first time in order to save his mother. Edward's acquaintance Reginald Birch, unknown to him a Templar and the one responsible for the attack, was appointed Haytham's legal guardian and took him on an unsuccessful quest throughout Europe to find Jennifer, during which Haytham was trained in the ways of the Templars, eventually joining the order in 1744.

In 1754, he was tasked by Birch to travel to the Thirteen Colonies after retrieving a "Piece of Eden", a powerful artifact made by the lost Precursor race, from the Assassins, to find the Precursor temple it was thought to open, as well as establishing a presence for the Order on the continent as the new Grand Master of the Colonial Rite of the Templar Order. Recruiting Charles Lee, William Johnson, Thomas Hickey, Benjamin Church, and John Pitcairn, Haytham was successful in establishing a base for the Order on the continent after killing his former associate Edward Braddock. However, his quest to find the temple his Piece of Eden was supposed to open proved unsuccessful. During this time, he had a brief relationship with a Native American woman, Kaniehtí꞉io (or "Ziio"), which resulted in the latter remaining pregnant with their son, Ratonhnaké:ton. Haytham left Ziio to focus on his Templar affairs before their son was born, and did not learn about his existence until much later in life.

Haytham returned to Europe in 1757 to continue searching for Jennifer, which eventually led him to the Ottoman Empire, where he recovered her from slavers. After she revealed to him that Birch was behind their family's demise, he led an attack on his estate, where Birch was killed, and Haytham was gravely injured.

After recovering from his injuries, he returned to the colonies, where he extended the Templar's influence. From 1758 to 1760, he worked with former Assassin-turned-Templar Shay Patrick Cormac to keep the Assassins from accessing Precursor sites that could lead to devastating earthquakes, eventually taking out his father's former first mate and fellow Assassin Adéwalé in the wake of the Siege of Louisburg. As the Assassins refused to give up hunting for the Precursor sites, Haytham and Shay eventually clashed with the remaining Assassins in a Precursor site in the Arctic, where the Colonial Brotherhood of Assassins was defeated and their leader, Achilles Davenport, crippled by Haytham.

After destroying the Assassins and making the Templars the dominant force on the continent, Haytham's main goal over the next two decades was to replace British colonial rule and establish a new state where the Templars' ideals would become law. However, his attempts were thwarted by his son, now known as Connor, who was trained as an Assassin by Achilles to take vengeance on the Templars, whom Connor blamed for an attack on his village which killed his mother. His fellow Templars had chosen not to tell Haytham of the attack, knowing the news of Ziio's death would affect him, but when questioned for details, they revealed that it was ordered by George Washington. The news of having a son shocked Haytham, who became torn between his loyalty to the Order and his newfound sense of paternal responsibility. When Connor was later framed by the Templars for a plot to assassinate Washington, Haytham, not wanting to have his son's death on his conscience, secretly saved him from his execution.

In 1778, Haytham and Connor formally met and formed an unstable alliance to track down former Templar Benjamin Church and further the Revolution. Realizing his son could become an important asset if converted to the Templars, Haytham took this opportunity to teach him about the Order's true goals and motives, and eventually told him the truth about Washington's attack on his tribe, hoping to turn Connor against the latter. However, this had the opposite effect, as Connor became distrustful of both Haytham and Washington and cut ties with them, yet continued supporting the Continental Army. 

Eventually admitting he would not be able to turn his son into a Templar and realizing the threat he posed to the Order, Haytham decided to do his best to stop him from destroying what was left of the Colonial Templars. In 1781, correctly predicting that Connor would target his last remaining ally, Charles Lee, Haytham sent the latter away after giving him his Piece of Eden for safekeeping, and waited for his son's arrival at Fort George. When Connor infiltrated the fort expecting to find Lee, Haytham ambushed him, but was ultimately bested by Connor, who mortally wounded him. Before dying, Haytham mocked Connor and his Assassin ideals, saying he did not regret his actions, but admitted that he was still proud of his son's growth and that he should have killed him much earlier. Sometime after Haytham's death, Connor recovered his journal, in which the former revealed that he did not expect to survive his final confrontation with Connor and that he wanted his son to have his journal, so that he would better understand his point of view and maybe forgive him, implying that Haytham let Connor kill him.

Other appearances
Aside from Assassin's Creed III and Rogue, Haytham has made cameo appearances in several other games in the series. In Assassin's Creed IV: Black Flag, which stars his father Edward, he appears as a young child in a post-credits scene, while the fictional video games subsidiary of Abstergo Industries considers him suited as a video game protagonist advocating the Templar's ideals, due to him being regarded as one of the greatest Templars in history. This idea has materialized in Assassin's Creed Unity, where the fictional video game The Lone Eagle, starring him, can be seen at the start of the game. Alongside multiple other Templar characters from the series, Haytham appears in the 2014 online role-playing collectible card game Assassin's Creed Memories.

Reception
Haytham was well-received as a character and often contrasted with his mixed to negatively received son, Connor. In a contemporary review of Assassin's Creed III for PC Gamer, Chris Thursten called Haytham a good villain but also observed that "the writers seem to like [Haytham] more than they do their ostensible lead [Connor]." However, a lot of contemporary reviewers refused to give a detailed account on Haytham, in order to not spoil the plot twist that he, a Templar, is the game's first protagonist. Alex Hutchinson, Creative Director of Assassin's Creed noted that the character faced some backlash as a surprise protagonist due to his arc being too long, but pointed out that he remains a fan favorite, making his way into other installments and selling a lot of action figures, whereas GamesRadar+ lauded this move as "bold" in a list of gaming's most satisfying character switches.

IGN listed Haytham among the best new video game characters of 2012, claiming that "no man is as cunning, conniving, and sassy as Haytham Kenway". In 2020, IGN Brasil ranked Haytham as the second best villain in the franchise. In a ranking of all Assassin's Creed characters by PC Gamer, Haytham was ranked much higher than Connor (who finished last) and also eclipsed his father Edward, with the reviewer comparing him favorably to James Bond, noting that "his ruthlessness make him a joy to play as", in contrast to Connor. In a similar ranking, Haytham finished seventh in a list of the ten best characters in the series, where his role as a "superb villain" was a good contrast to the game's protagonist, with Haytham being one of the "most charismatic characters seen in Assassin’s Creed to date", while he was ranked the franchises tenth-greatest protagonist by German outlet GamePro, who noted that his moral ambiguity and complexity made players reflect on the nature of the Templar Order for the first time in the series' history. Likewise, GameRevolution featured Haytham in a list of "video game villains who were actually right", especially in regards to his vision of an ideal state. 

Adrian Hough, the voice actor who portrayed Haytham, was nominated for a BAFTA Games Award in the "Performer" category at the 9th British Academy Games Awards ceremony for his portrayal. In an interview, the actor noted the positive fan response his character had received, especially in regards to cosplay.

While discussing which characters should be included in a future Netflix series based on the video games, Matthew Aguilar of Comicbook.com opted for Haytham, noting his charm and backstory, calling him one of the most interesting villains in the series.

Analysis
Writing for Heavy, Paul Meekin observed that the Templar Order seeks control of governments, finances, and the day-to-day lives of individuals they view as "too dangerous to themselves to be trusted" because they believe that this is the best solution for humanity's supposedly self-destructive nature; he highlighted a quote by Haytham from Assassin's Creed III where the character posits that it is within humanity's nature to be told what to believe and how to believe it. Nick Dinicola from PopMatters noted that while the Templars can produce good leaders, in truth their true goal is to consolidate power for personal gain: Haytham himself is "sympathetic to the plights of those beneath him, but he’s among terrible company: two tyrants and a slave trader". With regards to his position and legacy within his Order, Dinicola drew attention to in-game Templar propaganda presented in Rogue which contends that Haytham was “slain by the ungrateful [Assassin] son who could not appreciate the wisdom of his pragmatic, race-blind approach to politics and personal life” as an example of how the Templars use their position of power to rewrite history and promote themselves in a more favorable light.

References

Assassin's Creed characters
Fictional British people in video games
Fictional people from London
Fictional criminals in video games
Fictional English people of Welsh descent
Fictional explorers in video games
Fictional fist-load fighters 
Fictional hapkido practitioners
Fictional knife-fighters 
Fictional martial arts trainers
Fictional mass murderers
Fictional murdered people
Fictional people from the 18th-century
Fictional socialites
Fictional swordfighters in video games
Fictional traceurs and freerunners
Male characters in video games
Video game characters introduced in 2012
Nobility characters in video games
Video game protagonists
Video game antagonists
Vigilante characters in video games
Knights Templar in popular culture